Rolands Šmits (born June 25, 1995) is a Latvian professional basketball player for Žalgiris Kaunas of the LKL and the EuroLeague. At a height of 2.08 m (6'10"), and a weight of 106.4 kg (235 lbs.), he can play at either the power forward or center positions.

Early career
Šmits came up through the junior youth ranks of the Latvian club BK Valmiera. He left his native Latvia, for Spain in 2011. He joined the Spanish club Baloncesto Fuenlabrada, and played for their feeder team in the amateur Spanish fourth-tier level Liga EBA, in the 2011–12 season.

Professional career 
Šmits made his debut in the Spanish top-tier level Liga ACB, with Fuenlabrada, during the 2012–13 season, while also seeing action for Grupo Eulen Carrefour El Bulevar de Ávila, in the country’s third-tier division LEB Plata, that same season. From 2013 to 2015, he primarily played for Fuenlabrada's reserve team in LEB Plata sides Fundación Baloncesto Fuenlabrada and the affiliated team Viten Getafe respectively. But, he also earned increasing playing minutes in the top-tier level ACB. 

In the 2016–17 season, Šmits won the European-wide 2nd-tier level EuroCup's Rising Star Award, after shooting 55.1% from the field overall, 60.4% from 2 point field goal range, and 48.8% from 3 point field goal range, while averaging 9.4 points, 2.8 rebounds, 0.9 assists, and 0.6 steals per game, with Fuenlabrada during the EuroCup season.

In September 2017, he signed a five-year contract with FC Barcelona, but stayed on loan at Fuenlabrada until the summer of 2018.

On July 3, 2022, he signed a two-year contract with Žalgiris Kaunas of the LKL and the EuroLeague.

International career
Šmits competed with Latvia's junior national teams at the 2011 FIBA Europe Under-16 Championship, and at the 2012 FIBA Europe Under-18 Championship and 2013 FIBA Europe Under-18 Championship. He also played with Latvia's junior national team at the 2014 FIBA Europe Under-20 Championship and at the 2015 FIBA Europe Under-20 Championship.

Šmits received his first cap with the senior men's Latvian national basketball team in 2014.

Awards and accomplishments

Club
FC Barcelona
 Liga ACB: (2021)
 3× Copa del Rey: (2019, 2021, 2022)

Individual
 EuroCup Rising Star: (2017)
 Spanish League All-Young Players Team: (2017)

References

External links
Rolands Šmits at acb.com 
Rolands Šmits at draftexpress.com
Rolands Šmits eurobasket.com
Rolands Šmits at eurocupbasketball.com
Rolands Šmits at fiba.com (archive)
Rolands Šmits at fibaeurope.com
Rolands Šmits at nbadraft.net
Rolands Šmits at twitter.com

1995 births
Living people
Baloncesto Fuenlabrada players
FC Barcelona Bàsquet players
Latvian expatriate basketball people in Spain
Latvian men's basketball players
Liga ACB players
People from Valmiera
Power forwards (basketball)
Small forwards